Yunlin Station can refer to the following stations:

 Yunlin station (Wuxi Metro), a metro station in Wuxi
 Yunlin HSR station, a high speed rail station in Taiwan